The Fellowship of Christian Councils and Churches of Central Africa (FOCCOCA) (Communauté fraternelle des Conseils chrétiens des Eglises et Eglises d'Afrique centrale, COFCEAC) is an ecumenical organization founded in 2002. It is a member of the World Council of Churches. Its members include:

Christian Action for Peace and Justice
Council of Protestant Churches of Equatorial Guinea
Council of Protestant Churches in Cameroon
Church of Christ the King (Central African Republic) 
Evangelical Church of Gabon
Ecumenical Peace Service (Cameroon)
Ecumenical Council of Christian Churches in Congo (Brazzaville)

External links 

World Council of Churches listing

Christian organizations established in 2002
Members of the World Council of Churches
Christian organizations based in Africa
Regional councils of churches